The Gugl-Meeting Indoor is an annual athletics meeting at the TipsArena in Linz, Austria, which was founded in 2005.

Meeting records

Men

Women

References

External links
Gugl Indoor official website
Gugl Indoor Records 12 February 2018 updated

Athletics competitions in Austria
Annual track and field meetings
Recurring sporting events established in 2005
2005 establishments in Austria